Chandanhosur is a village in Belgaum district in the southern state of Karnataka, India.with approximate population of 2400

References

Villages in Belagavi district